The 2010 Connecticut Senate election was held on Tuesday, November 2, 2010 to elect members to the Connecticut State Senate, one from each of the state's 36 Senatorial districts. The date of this the election corresponded with other elections in the state, including ones for governor, U.S. Senate, and the Connecticut House of Representatives.

Senators elected are serving a two-year term, which began in January 2011.

The 2010 election cycle saw the election or re-election of 23 Democrats and 13 Republicans to fill the Senate's 36 seats. The only change in party representation occurred in the 31st District, where the incumbent Democrat was defeated, yielding a gain by the Republican Party. Three re-elected senators, all Democrats, resigned following the election, creating vacancies later filled by special elections on February 22, 2011.

Results 
Results of the 2010 Connecticut Senate election. Party shading denotes winner of Senate seat.

Notes
† Denotes resignation after election. Vacancy later filled by a special election on February 22, 2011.

TP Denotes that a minor, third party candidate (or candidates) also ran in this district's election.

RWI Denotes that a registered write-in candidate was also present in this district's election.

WF Denotes that this candidate also ran on the line of the Connecticut Working Families Party. The votes won by this candidate include both their Working Families and their party of affiliation figures combined.

I Denotes that this candidate also ran on the independent line. The votes won by this candidate include both their independent and their party of affiliation figures combined.

References 

2010 Connecticut elections
2010
Connecticut Senate